Jago & Litefoot is a Big Finish Productions audio drama based on the long-running British science fiction television series Doctor Who. It stars Christopher Benjamin and Trevor Baxter as Henry Gordon Jago and Professor George Litefoot, their characters from the 1977 TV story The Talons of Weng-Chiang. The Mahogany Murderers was an entry in the Companion Chronicles range of audio plays and effectively acted as a pilot for this series. Justin Richards is the script editor.

Thirteen series were released between 2010 and 2017, along with a handful of special releases and, in 2021, a fourteenth series adapting episodes originally planned before Baxter's death. Each series consists of a box set of 4 hour-long plays. Between the fourth and fifth series, the duo travelled with the Doctor (Colin Baker) for a pair of adventures, Voyage to Venus and Voyage to the New World, as single-disc releases. Additionally, a pair of Short Trips were released in March & April 2017 called "The Jago & Lightfoot Revival" (featuring the Tenth and Eleventh Doctors); while they also reunited with the Fourth Doctor for The Justice of Jalxar, The Beast of Kravenos and the Sixth Doctor in Stage Fright.

Cast

a.

Episodes

Series 1 (2010)
Series 1 comprised 4 episodes and was released in 2010. It featured the return of Sgt Quick (previously PC Quick), who appeared in The Talons of Weng-Chiang, and the character of Lisa Bowerman's Ellie Higson, a barmaid acquaintance of the pair who had previously featured in The Mahogany Murderers. The series's main antagonist was the mysterious Dr. Tulp, who was previously also mentioned in The Mahogany Murderers.

Series 2 (2011)
Series 2 comprised 4 episodes and was released in January 2011. The series' main antagonist was the vampiric Gabriel Sanders (David Collings).

Series 3 (2011)
Series 3 was released in June 2011, and featured the return of Louise Jameson's Leela. The season was described by director Lisa Bowerman as resembling a Victorian version of Sapphire and Steel. The series' main antagonist was the mysterious Professor Payne, whose "time breaks" were wreaking havoc all over the country.

Series 4 (2012)
Series 4 was released in March 2012, and guest starred Louise Jameson as Leela and Colin Baker as "Professor Claudius Dark". Its main villains were Mr Kempston and Mr Hardwick, who were pursuing Dark.

The Voyages of Jago & Litefoot (2012)

Following the fourth series, these two one-off stories depicted Jago and Litefoot taking a couple of trips in the TARDIS with the Sixth Doctor. The stories concluded with the Doctor apparently returning the two to the Red Tavern before departing to investigate a temporal surge that threw the TARDIS off-course, only for Jago and Litefoot to learn after the Doctor's departure that he has actually left them in 1968 rather than their home time.

Series 5 (2013)
Series 5 was released in March 2013. Following Voyage to the New World, it was set in the 1960s. It also featured return of Magnus Greel and Mr Sin, main villain of The Talons of Weng-Chiang, who were resurrected by the series' main antagonist, Guinevere Godiva.

Series 6 (2013)
Series 6 was released in September 2013 and set back in the 1890s. Its primary antagonist was the Colonel, portrayed by Geoffrey Whitehead.

Series 7 (2014)
Series 7 was released in April 2014. It followed Jago and Litefoot's lives as fugitives from the law.

Series 8 (2014)

Series 9 (2015)
It featured Jago & Litefoot's travel on a cruise. An actor Jamie Newall, who played Aubrey in series 5, played another version of Aubrey in series 8.

Series 10 (2015)
Series 10 was released in 2015, and featured Jago & Litefoot back in London after their cruise. The series' main antagonist was the obsessive Carruthers Summerton.

Jago & Litefoot & Strax (2015)
This was a one-off special featuring the revived series character, Strax, the Sontaran. It features the usual cast and Dan Starkey as Strax, reprising his role from the TV series. It follows series 10 and was released in November 2015.

Series 11 (2016)
Big Finish released an eleventh series of Jago & Litefoot  in April 2016, featuring Geoffrey Beevers as the Master.

Series 12 (2016)
Big Finish announced that there would be a twelfth series of Jago & Litefoot, it was released in October 2016.

Series 13 (2017)
Big Finish announced that there would be a thirteenth series of Jago & Litefoot, it was released in April 2017.

Special (2018)
Following Baxter's death in July 2017, Big Finish announced the release of a single episode to close the series, using archived recordings of Baxter's performances to round out the story.

Series 14 (2021) 
A fourteenth series was announced in the format of audiobooks adapting episodes originally planned before Baxter's death.

Awards and nominations

References

External links
Big Finish Productions – Jago and Litefoot Series One

2010 audio plays
Big Finish Productions
Victorian era in popular culture